Michael Haverty (born 1961) is an Irish former hurler and referee who played as a midfielder for the Galway senior team.

Haverty joined the team during the 1984-85 National League and was a regular member of the team for just one season. During that time he ended up as an All-Ireland runner-up.

At club level Haverty is a two-time Connacht medalist, the first with Killimordaly in 1986, and again in 2006 with Loughrea. In addition to this he has also won two county club championship medals.

References

1961 births
Living people
Loughrea hurlers
Galway inter-county hurlers
Hurling referees